SV Real Rincon is a football club from the town of Rincon in Bonaire in the Caribbean Netherlands. The team has won the Bonaire League on 11 occasions, most recently in 2018–19, as well as twice finishing top of the unofficial transitional championships.

Current squad 
2022 Caribbean Club Shield

Achievements
Bonaire League: 11
Winner: 1971–72, 1973, 1979, 1986, 1996, 1997, 2003–04, 2014, 2016–17, 2017–18, 2018–19
Winner (transitional championship): 2002–03, 2005–06
Runner-up: 1968–69, 1974–75, 1976, 1977, 1978, 1980–81, 1984, 1990–91, 2001–02, 2006–07, 2007–08, 2009, 2010, 2013
Runner-up (transitional championship): 2000–01, 2015–2016

Kopa MCB: 4
Winner: 2012, 2013, 2014, 2015

CONCACAF Caribbean Club Shield
Bronze: 2018

Kopa ABC: 8
Winner: 2018

International competition
Real Rincon competed in Concacaf international club competition for the first time in 2018 during the inaugural edition of the Caribbean Club Shield. In the tournament Rincon placed third, winning the bronze, after topping its group in the first stage and defeating SV Deportivo Nacional of Aruba in the third-place match.

Results list Real Rincon's goal tally first.

References

Football clubs in Bonaire
Football clubs in the Netherlands Antilles
1957 establishments in the Netherlands Antilles
Association football clubs established in 1957